EdVoice is an educational non-profit organization that supports a "kids-first" agenda for public school students in California. The group describes its mission as advocating for policies to increase measurable student achievement for all students in California and eliminating inequality of educational opportunity in public schools.  

According to its web site, the EdVoice network connects over 50,000 teachers, parents, and community leaders with their state elected officials on important educational issues.

Notable people
 Ted Lempert - founding CEO, former California State Assemblyman and founding director
 Christopher Cabaldon - former CEO, West Sacramento mayor
 Reed Hastings - EdVoice co-founder; founder/CEO of Netflix and former president of the California State Board of Education
 Steve Poizner - EdVoice co-founder; former California State Insurance Commissioner
 Laurene Powell Jobs - Former EdVoice board member; founder of College Track
 Bill Lucia - Current CEO

References

External links
 EdVoice Homepage

Non-profit organizations based in California